The office of Chancellor of the University of Houston System, held by Renu Khator, was created with the establishment of the University of Houston System  in 1977 as the chief executive officer of the university system.

Since 1997, the chancellor of the University of Houston System has also held the position of President of the University of Houston, thus making it a dual office.

References

External links
Office of the Chancellor and President, Renu Khator
UH System chancellors and presidents

 
Chancellors of the University of Houston System